The Twelve Armies refer to a group of garrisons under the fubing system of the Sui dynasty. The Twelve Armies of the Tang dynasty were created in 620 by transforming the Twelve Military Circuits created in 618. The Twelve Armies were suspended from 623 to 625 and were dissolved in 636 when the fubing system underwent reorganization.

The Twelve Armies were named:

Army of the Celestial Lion's Pelt
Army of the Celestial Herdboy
Army of the Celestial Black Lance
Army of the Celestial Twins
Army of the Celestial Water Bearer
Army of the Celestial Wolf
Fear-proof Army
Army of the Celestial Cornucopia
Army of the Great Celestial Bear
Army of the Celestial Parks and Gardens
Army of the Celestial Serpent
Army of the Celestial Bull

References

Bibliography

Military history of the Tang dynasty
Military units and formations of the Tang dynasty